Gaspar de Portolá y Rovira (January 1, 1716 – October 10, 1786) was a Spanish military officer, best known for leading the Portolá expedition into California and for serving as the first Governor of the Californias. His expedition laid the foundations of important Californian cities like San Diego and Monterey, and bestowed names to geographic features throughout California, many of which are still in use.

Early life

Gaspar de Portolá y Rovira, known in Catalan as Gaspar de Portolà i Rovira, was born on 1 January 1716 in Os de Balaguer, in Catalonia, to a family of minor Catalan nobility.

Gaspar served as a soldier in the Spanish army in Italy and Portugal. He was commissioned ensign in 1734, and lieutenant in 1743.

Following the expulsion of the Jesuits from the Spanish Empire, Portolá was tasked with removing the Jesuits from the Spanish missions in Baja California. He then ensured the missions  were turned over to the Franciscans and later to the Dominicans.

Expedition to Las Californias

Spain was driven to establish missions and other outposts on the Pacific Coast north of the Baja California Peninsula by fears that the territory would be claimed by foreign powers, in addition to its Catholic proselytizing mission and insatiable need for additional sources of income. The English, who had established colonies on the East Coast of the continent and north into what is now Canada, had also sent explorers into the Pacific. Russian fur hunters were pressing east from Siberia across the Bering Strait into the Aleutian Islands and beyond. 

Dispatches of January 23, 1768, exchanged between King Carlos and the viceroy, set the wheels in motion to extend Spain's control up the Pacific Coast and establish colonies and missions at San Diego Bay and Monterey Bay, which had been discovered and described in reports by earlier explorers Juan Cabrillo and Sebastián Vizcaíno. Vizcaíno had mapped the California coastline as far north as Monterey in 1602, but no significant Spanish settlement or even trading station had followed because those earlier explorations had failed to find a good harbor that the Spanish could have used for their long-standing Pacific maritime trade between Asia and Mexico: the Monterey Bay, sighted by both Cabrillo and Vizcaíno, was exposed to rough currents and winds.

In May 1768, the Spanish Visitor General, José de Gálvez, began to organize an expedition, by sea and by land. Portolá was created "Governor of the Californias" and given overall command. Junípero Serra, leader of the expedition's Franciscan missionaries, took command of spiritual matters. Sea and land detachments were to meet at San Diego Bay. 

The first ship, the San Carlos, sailed from La Paz on January 10, 1769 and a second, the San Antonio sailed from Cabo San Lucas on February 15. At the same time, the various elements of the land parties began to move
north from Loreto, Baja California Sur. The land expedition was assembled at Velicatá, where Serra established his first new mission. From there, Portolá's plan called for splitting the land expedition in two. The lead group, charged with building a wagon trail and pacifying the natives, was led by Captain Fernando Rivera y Moncada, and departed from Velicatá on March 24. With Rivera was the priest Juan Crespí, diarist for the Franciscans. The expedition led by Portolá, which included Junípero Serra (the President of the Missions), along with a combination of missionaries, settlers, and leather-jacket soldiers, including José Raimundo Carrillo, left Velicatá on May 15. Junípero Serra founded two more missions during the expedition: San Diego de Alcalá on July 16, 1769 and Mission San Carlos Borromeo de Carmelo on June 3, 1770.

Rivera reached the site of present-day San Diego in May, established a camp in the area that is now Old Town and awaited the arrival of the others. Because of an error by Vizcaíno in determining the latitude of the San Diego Harbor, the ships passed by it and landed too far north before finding their way back. The San Antonio arrived on April 11 and the San Carlos, the first ship to leave La Paz, having met with fierce winds and storms on the journey, arrived on April 29. A third vessel was to follow with supplies, but it was probably lost at sea. The land expedition of Portolá arrived on June 29. After their arduous journeys, most of the men aboard ship were ill, chiefly from scurvy, and many had died. Out of a total of 219 who left Baja California, little more than 100 now survived.

Eager to press on to Monterey Bay, Portolá and his expedition, consisting of Juan Crespí, 63 leather-jacket soldiers and 100 mules loaded down with provisions, headed north on July 14, 1769, marching two to four leagues (1 league = 2.6 miles) a day. The expedition recorded an earthquake on July 28 at the Santa Ana River. On July 29 they reached the site of present-day Fullerton, California at Hillcrest Park. On July 30, the expedition crossed the Puente Hills at a pass in La Habra (North Harbor Boulevard). They moved north-west to the San Gabriel River (near El Monte) where they built a bridge to cross over. This bridge ('La Puente' in Crespi's diary) is remembered in the name of today's nearby city of La Puente. They arrived in what is now Los Angeles on August 2,(where the Los Angeles River and Arroyo Seco river meet). The following day, they marched out the Indian trail that would one day become Wilshire Boulevard to the present site of Santa Monica. Winding around to the area of later Saugus, now part of Santa Clarita, they reached the area to become Santa Barbara on August 19, and the present day San Simeon area on September 13. Unable to remain on the coast due to the steep, difficult terrain, the party turned inland. They marched through the San Antonio Valley and on October 1, Portolá's party emerged from the Santa Lucia Mountains and reached the mouth of the Salinas River.

But they failed to discern the coastline's semi-circular shape, described by Vizcaíno as round like an "O", even though members of the party had twice marched along its beach. Having failed to find their goal, they marched on north and reached the area at the north end of the bay, where Crespí named a creek Santa Cruz on October 18. Pushing on, they reached a creek in the present day town of Pacifica on October 31.

On November 4, having crossed the low coastal mountain range above the creek, the party was stunned to catch a glimpse of the enormous San Francisco Bay from the mountain range, as the bay was previously unknown to the Spanish.  This sighting was crucial to the later settlement of California because unlike Monterey Bay, it was surrounded by land on all sides except the Golden Gate, and thus it was not exposed to rough ocean currents as was the Monterey Bay, which had been known to the Spanish since Cabrillo's exploration in the sixteenth century. Despite the earlier explorations of Cabrillo and Vizcaíno, and despite two centuries of Spanish sailing the Pacific for trade between Asia and Mexico, the San Francisco Bay had been missed because of the fog that frequently shrouded its entrance. If the San Francisco Bay had been discovered earlier, the region surrounding would have been settled by the Spanish earlier since it would have provided a safe, convenient harbor for Spain's Pacific maritime trade.

Portolá's party then headed back to San Diego, exploring and naming many localities in the region south of what eventually became known as the Golden Gate. Surviving on mule meat for most of the journey, they arrived on January 24, 1770.

On their way past Monterey Bay they again failed to recognize it as the same bay that Vizcaíno had described in 1602.

Second expedition

One of Portolá's officers, Captain Vicente Vila, convinced him that he had actually been exactly on the Bay of Monterey when he placed his second cross at what later became Pacific Grove. After replenishing supplies at San Diego, Portolá and Serra decided on a joint expedition by land and sea to again search for the bay and establish a colony if they were successful. The San Antonio sailed on April 16, 1770. On board were Serra, Miguel Costansó, military engineer and cartographer, and Doctor Pedro Prat, army surgeon, along with a cargo of supplies for the new mission at Monterey. On April 17, after mustering what forces he could, Portolá's land expedition, which included lieutenant Pedro Fages, 12 Spanish volunteers, seven leather-jacket soldiers, five Baja California Indians, two muleteers, and Juan Crespí serving as the expedition's chaplain, again marched north.

The expedition followed the same route they had the previous winter while returning to San Diego. After 36 days on the road, with only two days of rest, Portolá arrived at his second cross on May 24, 1770. He then saw that on a clear day and from a certain point of view the round harbor assumed the proportions described by the earlier enthusiastic explorers. Having recognized the bay, a Mass was conducted near the oak tree that the Carmelite missionaries with Vizcaíno had worshiped under in 1603, and possession was officially taken. On June 3, 1770, they laid the beginnings of the Mission San Carlos Borromeo de Carmelo and founded the Presidio of Monterey.

Later life
Governor Portolá's task was finished. He then left Captain Pedro Fages in charge, and on June 9 he sailed for San Blas, never to return to Upper California. In 1776, Portolá was appointed the governor of Puebla. After the appointment of his successor in 1784, he was advanced money for expenses and returned to Spain, where he served as commander of the Numancia cavalry dragoon regiment. On February 7, 1786 he was appointed King's Lieutenant for the strongholds and castles of Lleida. He died that same year, in October.

Legacy

A 9 foot (2.7 m) statue in Pacifica, California was sculpted by the Catalan sculptor Josep Maria Subirachs and his associate, Francesc Carulla. It was given to the people of California by the Catalan government in 1988.  A ten-foot high oil-on-canvas portrait of Portolá by Albert Herter in 1929 hangs in the Los Angeles Central Library's History Room.

The city of Portola in Plumas County, the town of Portola Valley in San Mateo County, and the Portola neighborhood of San Francisco were named after Portolà.

A number of schools in California were also named after him, including Portola Hills Elementary School in Portola Hills, Portola Elementary School in San Bruno, Gaspar de Portola Middle School in Tierrasanta, Portola Middle School in Tarzana, Portola Middle School in Orange, & Portola High School in Irvine.  The school in Orange is close to the spot where the expedition crossed the Santa Ana River, and the school has a 60-foot mural depicting the Portolà Expedition.

Portola Parkway running through Irvine and Lake Forest (though not connected as of 2018), was also named after Portolà. It is said that Portolà used the same route Portola Parkway now runs across. Portola Drive, which runs parallel to and near the Monterey Bay shoreline, is the main street of the Pleasure Point area of Santa Cruz County. Portola Avenue is also a north-south street located in Palm Desert in the Coachella Valley.

References

Further reading

External links

Biography of Gaspar de Portolá  at the  San Diego Historical Society website
Early Exploration of San Diego: 1542 to 1769 at the California History & Culture Conservancy website (archived)
Portolá's History and Statue in Pacifica, California(archived)
Spanish exploration of the Northwest Coast of North America website article (archived)
Sweeney Ridge, Golden Gate National Recreation Area Portola Discovery Site in San Mateo County, California

Explorers of California
Governors of the Californias
People of New Spain
People of the Californias
People of the Spanish colonial Americas
Spanish explorers of North America
Spanish untitled nobility
1716 births
1786 deaths
18th-century Mexican people
18th-century Spanish people
Military personnel from Catalonia
People from Catalonia
Soldiers from Catalonia
American people of Catalan descent
People from Noguera (comarca)